Jean Chapman (born 30 October 1929) is a British writer of romance novels since 1981 and a lecturer in creative writing. Her debut novel The Unreasoning Earth and The Red Pavilion were both shortlisted for the Parker Pen Romantic Novel of the Year Award. She was elected the twenty Chairman (2001–2003) of the Romantic Novelists' Association and is the three-time President of the Leicester Writer's Club.

Biography
Chapman married Lionel Alan Chapman; they had 1 son and 2 daughters. In 1989, she obtained a BA at Open University.

Bibliography

Single novels
The Unreasoning Earth (1981)
Tangled Dynasty (1984)
The Forbidden Path (1986)
Savage Legacy (1987)
The Bellmakers (1991)
Fortune's Woman (1991)
A World Apart (1993)
The Red Pavilion (1995)
The Soldier's Girl (1997)
This Time Last Year (1999)
A New Beginning (2001)
By Touch Alone (2015)

Philipps-Sinclair Saga
And a Golden Pear (2002)
Danced Over the Sea (2004)

John Cannon Series
Both Sides of the Fence (2009)
A Watery Grave (2011)
Deadly Serious (2013)
Deadly Zeal (2015)
''Deadly Odds (2018)
Source for bibliography:

References and sources

                   

British romantic fiction writers
1929 births
Living people